Kalamo may refer to:
 Kalamo Township, Michigan
 Kalamon, Drama
 Kalamo, an Arabic–Malagasy pidgin spoken by the Antemoro people of Madagascar